The Bururi forest shrew (Myosorex bururiensis) is a species of mouse shrew native to Burundi. It was first described by Peterhans et al. in 2010, and is defined by a broad hexagonal skull, short tail, and long claws.

References 

Myosorex